Siegfried Radandt (born 29 September 1937) is a German bobsledder. He competed in the four man event at the 1976 Winter Olympics.

References

1937 births
Living people
German male bobsledders
Olympic bobsledders of West Germany
Bobsledders at the 1976 Winter Olympics
Sportspeople from Stuttgart
20th-century German people